Osage High School (School of the Osage) is a secondary school located in Osage Beach, Missouri.  Approximately 96% of the students who attend the school are Caucasian, 1% are Hispanic, and the small remainder are Native American or African-American.  The student to teacher ratio is 15 to 1.  The school features numerous organizations and sports, and is an MSHSAA member.

References

External links

Public high schools in Missouri
Schools in Miller County, Missouri